The 2025 ICC Under-19 Women's T20 World Cup will be the second edition of the ICC Women's Under-19 Cricket World Cup, scheduled to be hosted by Malaysia and Thailand in 2025. Schedule of the tournament yet to be announced. India are the defending champion

Qualification

References

Under-19 Women's T20 World Cup